Nicholas Westcott  (born 20 July 1956) is a British diplomat. He is director of the Royal African Society since 2017 and a research associate at the Centre for International Studies and Diplomacy at SOAS University of London.  He was formerly a member of Her Majesty's Diplomatic Service, serving as British High Commissioner to Ghana and as managing director for Africa and the Middle East in the European External Action Service.  He has also published a number of books and articles on African history and international affairs.

Early life and education
Born in Guildford, Surrey, Westcott attended Epsom College and studied at Sidney Sussex College, Cambridge, from 1974 to 1982, taking a Bachelor of Arts in history and completing a PhD on "The Impact of the Second World War on Tanganyika, 1939–1951".

Career
He joined the British diplomatic service in 1982, serving in the UK Representation to the European Union in Brussels from 1985 to 1989, as the Deputy High Commissioner in Tanzania (1993–1996), and as Minister-Counsellor in the Embassy of the United Kingdom, Washington, D.C. (1999–2002). In the Foreign, Commonwealth and Development Office (then the FCO) Westcott worked as head of the Economic Relations Department (1996–1999), and as chief information officer and head of IT strategy from 2002 to 2007.  He was appointed British High Commissioner to Ghana in 2008–2011, and served simultaneously as British Ambassador to Ivory Coast, Burkina Faso, Niger and Togo.  In 2011, President Laurent Gbagbo of the Ivory Coast expelled Westcott and Canadian Ambassador Marie Isabelle Massip after their respective governments said they would no longer recognize Gbagbo emissaries.

In 2011, he was appointed by the first managing director for Africa in the EU's European External Action Service in Brussels, serving under the first High Representative of the Union for Foreign Affairs and Security Policy, Catherine Ashton.  In 2015 he was moved to become Managing Director for the Middle East and North Africa by HRVP Federica Mogherini.

In November 2017, Westcott returned to London to take up the role of director of the Royal African Society, and was appointed a research associate at the Centre for International Studies and Diplomacy as SOAS University of London.

He also sits on the boards of the African Center for Economic Transformation, based in Accra, Ghana, and the Foreign and Commonwealth Office Collection at King's College London.  He is a Fellow of the Royal Geographical Society, and a member of Chatham House.  He was made a Companion of  the Order of St Michael and St George in 1998.

Family 
Westcott was married for 30 years to Miriam Pearson (died 2018). They have one daughter and one son.

Publications 
 "The Impact of the Second World War on Tanganyika, 1939–49" in D. Killingray and R. Rathbone (ed.), Africa and the Second World War (1986), 
 Managed Economies in World War II, with P. Kingston and R. G. Tiedemann (1991), 
 Digital Diplomacy: the Impact of the Internet on International Relations, (2008)
 Responding to Conflict and Promoting Stability: European Policy in the Middle East and North Africa (2017)
 "The Trump Administration's Africa policy" (2019), African Affairs
 Imperialism and Development: the East African Groundnut Scheme and its legacy (2020),

References 

1956 births
Living people
High Commissioners of the United Kingdom to Ghana
Ambassadors of the United Kingdom to Burkina Faso
20th-century British male writers
Ambassadors of the United Kingdom to Togo
British expatriates in the United States
Ambassadors of the United Kingdom to Niger
British expatriates in Tanzania
Ambassadors of the United Kingdom to Ivory Coast
21st-century British diplomats
20th-century British diplomats
People from Guildford
Alumni of Sidney Sussex College, Cambridge
People educated at Epsom College
Companions of the Order of St Michael and St George
21st-century British male writers